In calculus, integration by parametric derivatives, also called parametric integration, is a method which uses known Integrals to integrate derived functions. It is often used in Physics, and is similar to integration by substitution.

Statement of the theorem
By using The Leibniz integral rule with the upper and lower bounds fixed we get that

It is also true for non-finite bounds.

Examples

Example One: Exponential Integral
For example, suppose we want to find the integral

 

Since this is a product of two functions that are simple to integrate separately, repeated integration by parts is certainly one way to evaluate it. However, we may also evaluate this by starting with a simpler integral and an added parameter, which in this case is t = 3:

 

This converges only for t > 0, which is true of the desired integral. Now that we know

 

we can differentiate both sides twice with respect to t (not x) in order to add the factor of x2 in the original integral.

 

This is the same form as the desired integral, where t = 3.  Substituting that into the above equation gives the value:

Example Two: Gaussian Integral
Starting with the integral ,
taking the derivative with respect to t on both sides yields
.
In general, taking the n-th derivative with respect to t gives us
.

Example Three: A Polynomial
Using the classical  and taking the derivative with respect to t we get
.

Example Four: Sums
The method can also be applied to sums, as exemplified below.  
Use the Weierstrass factorization of the sinh function:
.
Take the logarithm:
.
Derive with respect to z:
.
Let :
.

References

External links
WikiBooks: Parametric_Integration

Integral calculus